Thomas Fenton Knight (April 23, 1882 – July 7, 1954) was an American politician who served in the California legislature as representative of California's 48th State Assembly district from 1939 to 1949. During World War I, he served in the United States Army.

References

United States Army personnel of World War I
1882 births
1954 deaths
20th-century American politicians
Republican Party members of the California State Assembly